is a Japanese manga artist and character designer.

Works

Manga artist
  (1997, Monthly Young Magazine, Kodansha, one-shot)
  (1998, Bessatsu Monthly Young Magazine, Kodansha, one-shot)
  (2001, Monthly Young Magazine, Kodansha, web manga)
  (2001, Bessatsu Pachislot Panic 7, Byakuya-Shobo)
 Karasuma Kyoko no Jikenbo (2002–12, written by Ōji Kiroi, BStreet→Monthly Comic Birz, Gentosha, 10 volumes)
 Chick Dismantler (2003, Blade Gunz, Mag Garden, one-shot)
  (2005–08, Robot, Wanimagazine)
 No More Heroes 2: Desperate Struggle Erotic Comic (2010, Marvelous Entertainment)
  (2011–present, Young Gangan, Square Enix, 5 volumes)
 Tokyo Karasu (written by Hiroki Miyashita, Monthly Sunday Gene-X, Shogakukan) – character design from 2012 to 2013

Character designer
 Anime
 Speed Grapher (2005, Gonzo)
 Intrigue in the Bakumatsu – Irohanihoheto (2006–07, Sunrise)
 Bubuki Buranki (2016,  Sanzigen)
 Under the Dog (2016, Kinema Citrus)

 Video games
 Osu! Tatakae! Ouendan (2005, INiS/Nintendo)
 No More Heroes (2007, Grasshopper Manufacture/Marvelous Entertainment)
 Chūmon Shiyou ze! Ore-tachi no Sekai (2008, GAE)
 Half-Minute Hero (2009, Marvelous Entertainment)
 No More Heroes 2: Desperate Struggle (2010, Grasshopper Manufacture/Marvelous Entertainment)
 No More Heroes: Heroes' Paradise (2010, feelplus/AQ Interactive/Marvelous Entertainment)
 Ace Combat: Assault Horizon (2011, Bandai Namco Games)
 Fire Emblem Awakening (2012, Intelligent Systems/Nintendo)
 Liberation Maiden (2012, Level-5/Grasshopper Manufacture)
 Puzzle & Dragons (2012, GungHo Online Entertainment)
 Unchain Blaze EXXIV (2012, Furyu) – Hilda only
  Liberation Maiden SIN (2013, 5pb./Mages)
 Ranko Tsukigime's Longest Day (2014, Grasshopper Manufacture/Bandai Namco Games)
 Tekken 7 (2015, Bandai Namco Entertainment) – Lucky Chloe and Jin Kazama only
 Fire Emblem Fates (2015, Intelligent Systems/Nintendo)
 Pokémon Go (2016, Niantic) - Team Leaders and Professor Willow design, official player character artwork
 Fire Emblem Heroes (2017, Intelligent Systems/Nintendo)
 Xenoblade Chronicles 2 (2017, Monolith Soft/Nintendo) – Aegaeon and Agate design
 Travis Strikes Again: No More Heroes (2019, Grasshopper Manufacture)
 Daemon X Machina (2019, Marvelous)
 AI: The Somnium Files (2019, Spike Chunsoft)
 Pokémon Sword and Shield (2019, Game Freak/Nintendo/The Pokémon Company) – The Pokémon Toxel, Toxtricity, Gigantamax Toxtricity and Falinks designs
 No More Heroes III (2021, Grasshopper Manufacture)
 AI: The Somnium Files – Nirvana Initiative (2022, Spike Chunsoft)
 Pokémon Scarlet and Violet (2022, Game Freak/Nintendo/The Pokémon Company) - The Pokémon Varoom, Revavroom, Cetoddle and Cetitan designs
	
 Other
 Vocaloid (2009, AH-Software) — SF-A2 Miki V2, V4

References

External links

1978 births
Living people
Manga artists from Tokyo
Video game artists